Lõhmus is a common surname in Estonia (meaning linden), and may refer to:
 (1950–2005), writer
Kaire Lõhmus (better known as Kaire Vilgats; born 1976), singer and actress
Lembit Lõhmus (born 1947), graphic artist
Sven Lõhmus (born 1972), composer, producer and lyricist
Uno Lõhmus (born 1952), jurist

See also
Pärn, more famous Estonian surname meaning Linden

Estonian-language surnames